Allean Grant (born 10 February 1983) is a Caymanian footballer who plays as a forward. He has represented the Cayman Islands at full international level.

References

Living people
1983 births
Caymanian footballers
Cayman Islands international footballers
Latinos FC players
Tigers FC (Cayman Islands) players
Association football forwards